These are the results of the 2002 IAAF World Cup, which took place in Madrid, Spain on 21 and 22 September 2002.

Results

100 m

Women

200 m

400 m

800 m

1500 m

3000 m

5000 m

3000 m Steeplechase

100/110 m hurdles

400 m hurdles

4 x 100 m relay

4 x 400 m relay

High jump

Pole vault

Long jump

Triple jump

Shot put

Discus throw

Hammer throw

Javelin throw

References

Competition results
 Official site
Full Results by IAAF

IAAF World Cup results
Events at the IAAF Continental Cups